Middlebrook is a historic house located at 4001 Middlebrook Pike in Knoxville, Tennessee.  It was constructed circa 1845 by Gideon Morgan Hazen, and is one of the oldest existing frame residences in Knoxville.

The house is a typical large estate home. The property also includes a small Gothic Revival spring house.  The house was listed on the National Register of Historic Places in 1974.

References

Further reading
 Knoxville: Fifty Landmarks. (Knoxville: The Knoxville Heritage Committee of the Junior League of Knoxville, 1976), page 10.

Houses in Knoxville, Tennessee
Houses on the National Register of Historic Places in Tennessee
National Register of Historic Places in Knoxville, Tennessee